, there were 106 universities in England and 5 university colleges out of a total of around 130 in the United Kingdom. This includes private universities but does not include other Higher Education Institutions that have not been given the right to call themselves "university" or "university college" by the Privy Council or Companies House (e.g. colleges of higher education), or member institutions of the University of London at that time.

The following is a list of English universities and university colleges recognised by the Office for Students (OfS), together with the date on which they were created. OfS publishes the official list.

Universities

'Established' refers to the date when an institution was initially established as a university. Where two dates are listed below the first gives the year the institution became a university while the second (in parentheses) gives the year the institution was established in another form (for example, if it was previously a college or a central institution). See also List of UK universities by date of foundation. If only a dash and a year in parentheses is given, the institution is either a university college or a member institution of the University of London that does not hold university status, and the date in parentheses refers to the year of its establishment.

HESA statistics do not cover other private universities or private university colleges; student numbers for such institutions (where given) are referenced in the table.

'Tuition fee' refers to the annual tuition fee for Home/EU students studying full-time undergraduate degree courses, from the Reddin Survey of University Tuition Fees 2017–18 (except where otherwise referenced). 'p/g only' means the university was listed by the Higher Education Funding Council of England (HEFCE) as providing postgraduate courses only, so has no undergraduate tuition fees.

'Degree powers' refers to whether the university has the power to award all degrees, degrees of the University of London, or taught degrees. Institutions with only foundation degree awarding powers are not eligible for university or university college title.

See also
List of universities in the United Kingdom
List of universities in Northern Ireland
List of universities in Scotland
List of universities in Wales
List of universities in Yorkshire and the Humber

Notes

References

England
Universities
Universities